Shawn Ray (born September 9, 1965 in Placentia, California, U.S.) is a former professional bodybuilder and author.

Bodybuilding career
In his 2005 interview, Ray said, "the two influences that were the main reasons that I got into bodybuilding in the first place, was bodybuilders Chris Dickerson and Bob Paris." In a 1990 documentary, Ray cited Francis Benfatto as a major inspiration, along with Paris. Known for his narcissism and sardonic temperament among his peers and current crop of IFBB male bodybuilders. His bad reputation was further exacerbated by insensitive public comments he made about Shawn Rhoden after his death on November 6, 2021.

In over 30 major bodybuilding competitions, Ray only failed once to place in the top five. Signing his first professional bodybuilding sponsor contract in 1988, Ray has been featured in six video documentaries; Lifestyles of the Fit & Famous (Biopic), Final Countdown (Contest Prep for Olympia 1998), Inside & Out- Behind the Muscle, a look at his daily life on the Pro Circuit, To The Extreme (Training Video) Best of Shawn Ray (History of Shawn Ray). "Fitness After 40" which is a biographical and documentary instyle, showcases Ray's life after the competitive stage being married with his first child while getting back on the horse and getting in shape.

He is mentioned in The New Encyclopedia of Modern Bodybuilding by Bill Dobbins and Arnold Schwarzenegger. Ray also wrote a book about how to become a bodybuilder, named The Shawn Ray Way. Ray has appeared on more Flexible Magazine covers than any other bodybuilder in the history and also has also featured in many fitness and bodybuilding magazines worldwide. Ray was a co-host on Flex Magazine Workout on ESPN for 5 years as well as hosting bodybuilding competitions for ESPN as a commentator for 8 years.

Ray was the Co-Master of Ceremonies for the 2006 and 2007 Mr. Olympia Competitions held in Las Vegas, Nevada. He is the creator of the only charity fundraiser for professional bodybuilding, Vyo Tech Nutritionals presents: Shawn Ray's CHOC Hospital Golf Invitational. Over the last ten years with the help of other pro fitness, figure and bodybuilding champions, as well as supplement companies and magazines, he has helped raise and donate over $55,000.00 to the Children's Hospital of Orange County by hosting this event annually at Black Gold Golf Club in Yorba Linda, CA.

Ray was also the first professional bodybuilder to fail the drug testing at the Arnold Classic, which was when he first lost the title in 1990. Although, he went on to win the title again in 1991.

Ray has transitioned from being a competitive bodybuilder in 2001 to working with various companies such as FasciaBlaster, Mr. Tortilla, Old School Bodybuilding Clothing , and Mutant Nutrition in his post-retirement career. He placed in the top five at the Mr. Olympia competition for twelve consecutive years from 1990 to 2001, two of those being first runner-up finishes.

He promoted the Shawn Ray Colorado Pro/Am Classic Contest-Expo, held in Denver, Colorado in 2006 and 2007. Ray also produced a DVD titled 'Fitness after 40' in which he tries to get back into shape.
He is now a Feature Writer for Digital Muscle Media and the Host of Mr. Olympia PPV. He is also made a video documentary called Evolution of Bodybuilding – The Movie" 

 Ray is also the Master of Ceremonies for the Amateur Arnold Classic and a Consultant for Mr. Olympia LLC.

Ray is a prominent spokesman, master of ceremonies and expert commentator for IFBB Pro League & NPC shows, most notably the Mr. Olympia. He is currently the Editor in Chief of DigitalMuscle.com, he continues to promote Hawaii's largest contest, NPC Shawn Ray Hawaiian Classic in Honolulu which he added a Pro Classic Physique Division in 2021z
Ray received the Ben Weider "Lifetime Achievement Award" in the summer of 2020 for his contributions to the sport and as an athlete on behalf of the Ben Weider family, promoter, Tim Gardner, Dan Solomon and Ron Wilkins.

Personal life
Ray married in 2003 and his daughter, Asia Monet was born on August 10, 2005. In 2008, Ray and his wife, Kristie, welcomed their second daughter, Bella Blu. In 2016 Ray reunited with his eldest daughter, Kerri, whom was conceived in high school.

In retirement, Ray has stayed involved with bodybuilding through "muscle camps," seminars, grand openings, and as a master of ceremonies for contests. Ray has Promoted the New York Pro contest in New York City. He is a Global Ambassador for supplement giant, Mutant & Editor in Chief of Digital Muscle Media.

Mr. Olympia contest history
Ray competed in three different decades before retiring at age 36 in 2001. Although one of the most frequent competitors in the Mr. Olympia show, the winner's title eluded him for his entire career. Nevertheless, Ray was a Top 5 Mr. Olympia Finalist for 12 Consecutive Years, a feat no other bodybuilder has duplicated.

In his whole career, Ray beat every competitor he met on stage at least once, with the exception of 8-Time Mr. Olympia Lee Haney and 6-Time Mr. Olympia Dorian Yates. At 5'5", 210 lbs, Ray was called a Giant Killer, having to give up at least 40 to 50 lbs and 4–5" to three of the sport's most prolific bodybuilders, including Lee Haney, Dorian Yates, and Ronnie Coleman.
1988 Mr. Olympia – 13th Place
1990 Mr. Olympia – 3rd Place
1991 Mr. Olympia – 5th Place
1992 Mr. Olympia – 4th Place
1993 Mr. Olympia – 3rd Place
1994 Mr. Olympia – 2nd Place
1995 Mr. Olympia – 4th Place
1996 Mr. Olympia – 2nd Place
1997 Mr. Olympia – 3rd Place
1998 Mr. Olympia – 5th Place
1999 Mr. Olympia – 5th Place
2000 Mr. Olympia – 4th Place
2001 Mr. Olympia – 4th Place

Titles and honors
1983 California Gold Cup 
1984 Mr. Teenage Los Angeles (Short & Overall)
1984 Teenage Mr. California
1985 Teenage Mr. Orange County 
1985 Teenage National Championships 
1985 Jr. World Championships 
1986 Jr. National Championships 12thPlace Light heavy)
1987 Mr. California (Lightheavy & Overall)
1987 National Championships (Lightheavy & Overall)
1990 Pro Ironman Champion
1990 Arnold Classic Champion (lost title due to failing drug test)
1991 Arnold Classic Champion
 Inducted into the IFBB Hall of Fame of professional bodybuilding in January 2007.
 Received Ben Weider Lifetime Achievement Award 2020.
 In October 2003, El Dorado High School in Placentia, Calif. inducted Ray into its "Football Hall of Fame" In 1983, He set the school's all-time rushing record and record for longest run from scrimmage (98 yards), both of which still stand.
His Football Jersey, and the NUMBER "1" have been retired and never worn again by an El Dorado Hawk to date.

References

External links
The Shawn Ray Official website
Career summary and interview
Shawn Ray Gallery
24/7 Physique Website

1965 births
Living people
African-American bodybuilders
African-American Christians
American bodybuilders
American Christians
Professional bodybuilders
Sportspeople from Fullerton, California